The Uniseum is the university museum of the Albert-Ludwigs-Universität in Freiburg im Breisgau, Germany. The name is a portmanteau of Universität and Museum (university and museum). As a neologism, it is trademarked.

Opened in 2004, the museum documents the history of Freiburg’s university from its foundation in 1457 up to the German student movement of the 1960s. The artefacts are organised on a thematic basis. Moreover, each of the university’s more influential disciplines - medicine, natural sciences and humanities - has its own designated section. Furthermore, there is a Cabinet of curiosities modelled after the ones from the Renaissance period, as well as a collection of moulages.

The Uniseum is located in the building of the Alte Universität (Old University), which has served as a university building since 1557. The vaulted cellars of the building offer a glimpse into the history of the building and its architectural antecedents.

See also
 List of Jesuit sites

References 
Eckart Roloff and Karin Henke-Wendt: Das Schaufenster einer bedeutenden Universität. (Uniseum, Freiburg im Breisgau) In: Besuchen Sie Ihren Arzt oder Apotheker. Eine Tour durch Deutschlands Museen für Medizin und Pharmazie. Volume 2, South Germany. Verlag S. Hirzel, Stuttgart 2015, p. 38–40, .

External links 
 Official website

Freiburg im Breisgau
University of Freiburg
Museums in Baden-Württemberg